Alonzo Sledge (August 15, 1854 – October 14, 1918) was a preacher and state representative in Texas. He served in the Texas House from 1879 to 1881.

He was a Republican. He lived in Chappell Hill. He was a Baptist. He married and had daughters.

He and other African American legislators who served during or after Reconstruction are listed on a monument that was unveiled in 2010.

See also
Sixteenth Texas Legislature
African-American officeholders during and following the Reconstruction era

References

1854 births
1918 deaths
Members of the Texas House of Representatives